is a railway station on the AbukumaExpress in the city of Date, Fukushima Japan.

Lines

Station layout
Yanagawa Kibōnomori Kōen-mae Station has one side platform serving a single bi-directional track. The station is unattended.

Adjacent stations

History
Yanagawa Kibōnomori Kōen-mae Station opened on July 1, 1988.

In 2002, it was chosen to be one of 100 stations representing the Tōhoku region.

Passenger statistics
In fiscal 2015, the station was used by an average of 197 passengers daily (boarding passengers only).

Surrounding area
 Yanagawa Kibōnomori Kōen
 Yanagawa Post Office

External links

  Abukuma Express home page

References

Railway stations in Fukushima Prefecture
Abukuma Express Line
Railway stations in Japan opened in 1988
Date, Fukushima